Keegan Smith  may refer to:

Keegan Smith (footballer, born 1999), New Zealand goalkeeper
Keegan Smith (soccer, born 1993), American soccer player
Keegan Smith (tennis) (born 1998), American tennis player